This is a list of flag bearers who have represented South Korea at the Olympics.

Flag bearers carry the national flag of their country at the opening ceremony of the Olympic Games.

Notes

See also
South Korea at the Olympics

References

South Korea at the Olympics
South Korea
Olympic flagbearers